Fax, short for facsimile, is a telecommunications technology used to transfer copies of documents over the telephone network. 

Fax may also refer to:

 Fax (Argentine TV show), between 1991 and 1992
 Fax (Pern), a character in Anne McCaffrey's Dragonriders of Pern series
 Fax (TV series), BBC children's show between 1985 and 1988
 FAX +49-69/450464, a German record company releasing ambient music
 FlyAsianXpress, commonly known as FAX, an airline operating in Malaysia
 Fresno Area Express, a public transit agency operating in Fresno, California
 Fax (surname), various people

See also
FACS (disambiguation)
Faxe, a town in Denmark